Jay Lycurgo (born 6 February 1998) is an English actor. He is known for his roles as Tim Drake in Titans (2021-present), Nathan Byrne in the Netflix series The Bastard Son & The Devil Himself (2022) and a gang member in The Batman (2022).

Early life
Lycurgo grew up in Croydon, the youngest of four children. He is of Jamaican, Sierra Leonean, and British heritage. His father is former professional footballer David Johnson. Lycurgo was partly inspired to act through watching productions at the local Fairfield Halls. After not getting into the BRIT School, his teacher suggested drama school. He went on to graduate with a Bachelor of Arts in Acting from Arts Educational School (ArtsEd) in 2019.

Career
Upon graduating from ArtsEd, Lycurgo made his television debut in an episode of the BBC One medical drama Doctors as well as his professional stage debut as David Beckoff in the 2019 Turbine Theatre production of the Torch Song Trilogy. This was followed by appearances in the miniseries I May Destroy You, Jimmy McGovern's television film Anthony, and the science fiction series War of the Worlds. He had small roles in films Listen and The Batman.

In 2021, Lycurgo began playing Tim Drake, a recurring role in the third season of the DC Universe series Titans. Lycurgo has stated he was proud to play a superhero of mixed race as there were not many examples of this when he was growing up. He reprised his role as a regular in season 4. The following year, he played Paul in the BBC Three sitcom Cheaters.

Also in 2022, Lycurgo stars in as Nathan Byrne in Netflix series The Bastard Son & The Devil Himself, an adaptation of the young adult fantasy novel Half Bad by Sally Green. Auditioning was completed during the COVID-19 pandemic over video while he was in Toronto. He has stated he related to the cheekiness and quick witted nature of his character Nathan. He has to physically prepare for the action  and fighting scenes in the series, which he has described  as "Misfits meets This is England", but has also been described as "Twilight meets Skins" and an "X-rated Harry Potter". He said he got into the headspace of playing a teenager despite being 24 years-old himself because “I feel like I’m just very childlike still, you know. I have a huge imagination…I think it’s a real shame that as we get older we feel like we have to stop being that kid in a playground. You know? I don’t think that needs to be the case. I feel like we should be able to still imagine things and be playful and creative. When you’re acting it’s just that sometimes you have to get the permission from the right people to be like, “No really go for it! Go there.” And then to yourself you just have to really believe that you’re in these places. When it comes to being a teenager again, I think I’m just quite fortunate to still be very immature.” As well as the playfulness and immaturity in the character Lycurgo told Newsweek how his characterisation of Nathan was also driven borne of an inherent loneliness saying "He is just a really lonely and isolated, quiet person, because he's always been in fight-and-flight [mode] and he doesn't trust anyone."

Filmography

Film

Television

Stage

References

External links
 

Living people
21st-century English male actors
Black British male actors
English people of Jamaican descent
English people of Sierra Leonean descent
People from Croydon
1998 births